Marianne Riddervold (born 5 March 1980) is a Norwegian orienteering competitor. She received a silver medal in the relay event at the 2005 World Orienteering Championships in Aichi, together with Marianne Andersen and Anne Margrethe Hausken.

She finished fourth with the Norwegian team in the relay event at the 2006 European Orienteering Championships in Otepää, and again 4th in Ventspils in 2008.

References

External links

1980 births
Living people
Norwegian orienteers
Female orienteers
Foot orienteers
World Orienteering Championships medalists
21st-century Norwegian women
Junior World Orienteering Championships medalists